The 1946 French Championships (now known as the French Open) was a tennis tournament that took place on the outdoor clay courts at the Stade Roland-Garros in Paris, France. The tournament ran from 18 July until 28 July. It was the 50th staging of the French Championships and the first one held after a six-year hiatus due to World War II. In 1946 and 1947 the French Championships were held after Wimbledon and were thus the third Grand Slam tennis event of the year. Marcel Bernard and Margaret Osborne won the singles titles.

Finals

Men's singles

 Marcel Bernard defeated  Jaroslav Drobný 3–6, 2–6, 6–1, 6–4, 6–3

Women's singles

 Margaret Osborne defeated  Pauline Betz  1–6, 8–6, 7–5

Men's doubles
 Marcel Bernard /  Yvon Petra defeated  Enrique Morea /  Pancho Segura  7–5, 6–3, 0–6, 1–6, 10–8

Women's doubles
 Louise Brough  /  Margaret Osborne defeated  Pauline Betz /  Doris Hart 6–4, 0–6, 6–1

Mixed doubles
 Pauline Betz /  Budge Patty defeated  Dorothy Bundy  /  Tom Brown  7–5, 9–7

References

External links
 French Open official website

French Championships
French Championships (tennis) by year
French Champ
French Championships
French Championships